Sitting volleyball was contested at the 2011 Parapan American Games from November 14 to 18 at the Pan American Volleyball Stadium in Guadalajara, Mexico.

Medal summary

Medal table

Medal events

Results

Preliminary round

|}

|}

Elimination round

Semifinals

|}

Fifth Place Game

|}

Bronze Medal Final

|}

Gold Medal Final

|}

External links
 

Events at the 2011 Parapan American Games
2011 in volleyball
2011 Parapan American Games
Sitting volleyball